Boys High may refer to:
 Boys High School (Brooklyn), Brooklyn, New York, United States
 Boys' High School & College (Allahabad, Uttar Pradesh), Allahabad, India
 Pretoria Boys High School, Brooklyn, Pretoria, South Africa